Hope (lat. spes) is one of the three theological virtues in Christian tradition.  Hope being a combination of the desire for something and expectation of receiving it, the virtue is hoping for Divine union and so eternal happiness. While faith is a function of the intellect, hope is an act of the will.

Overview
Thomas Aquinas defines hope as "...a future good, difficult but possible to attain...by means of the Divine Assistance...on Whose help it leans". Hope is, by its very nature, always concerned with something in the future. Like the theological virtues of faith and charity, hope finds its "origin, motive, and object" in God. In Hebrews 10:23, St. Paul says, "Let us hold unwaveringly to our confession that gives us hope, for he who made the promise is trustworthy." Like the other theological virtues, hope is an infused virtue. It is not, like good habits in general, the outcome of repeated acts or the product of our own industry. Hope is bestowed by God at baptism.

In the Christian tradition, hope in Christ and faith in Christ are closely linked, with hope having a connotation that means the one with hope has a firm assurance, through the witness of the Holy Spirit, that Christ has promised a better world to those who are His. The Christian sees death not just as the end of a passing life, but as the gateway to a future life without limitation and in all fullness. Pope Benedict XVI states: "Whoever believes in Christ has a future. For God has no desire for what is withered, dead, artificial, and finally discarded: he wants what is fruitful and alive, he wants life in its fullness and he gives us life in its fullness"

Hope can thus sustain one through trials of faith, human tragedies, or difficulties that may otherwise seem overwhelming. Hope is seen as "an anchor of the soul" as referenced in the Epistle to the Hebrews of the New Testament. Hebrews 7:19 also describes the "better hope" of the New Covenant in Christ rather than the Old Covenant of the Jewish law.

Hope is opposed to the sins of despair and presumption; refraining from them is adhering to the negative precept of hope. The positive precept is required when exercising some duties, as in prayer or penance.

Some forms of Quietism have denied that a human being should desire anything whatsoever to such an extent that they denied that hope was a virtue. Quietism was condemned as heresy by Pope Innocent XI in 1687 in the papal bull Coelestis Pastor.

Quotes
 "For in hope we were saved. Now hope that sees for itself is not hope. For who hopes for what one sees?" (Romans 8:24)

“Trust perfectly in the grace which is offered you in the revelation of Jesus Christ.” (Peter, 1:13)

 “I know well the plans I have in mind for you says the Lord, plans for your welfare and not for woe so as to give you a future of hope” (Jeremiah 29:11).
 "The Christian who hopes seeks God for himself or herself. In technical language, the formal object of theological hope is God-as-possessed."

 “Nobody can live without hope, even if it were only for the smallest things which give some satisfaction even under the words of conditions, even in poverty, sickness and social failure.”

Act of Hope
O my God, relying on Your almighty power and infinite mercy and promises, I hope to obtain pardon of my sins, the help of Your grace, and life everlasting through the merits of Jesus Christ, my Lord and Redeemer. Amen.

See also
Spe Salvi

Further reading

References

External links
Summa Theologica "Second Part of the Second Part" See Questions 17-22

Christian terminology
Virtue